Oliver Jones may refer to:

 Oliver Jones (Irish MP) (died 1664), Welsh-Irish soldier and member of the Parliament of Ireland
 Oliver Jones (judge) (died 1682), Irish politician and judge of the seventeenth century
 Oliver Jones (businessman) (1821–1899), Canadian politician
 O. W. Jones (1897–1975), American politician
 Oliver Jones (pianist) (born 1934), Canadian jazz pianist, organist, composer and arranger
 Oliver C Jones (born 1985), British artist
 Oliver Jones (visual effects artist), British
 Oliver Wendell Jones, a character in the comic strip Bloom County
 Oliver Jones (soccer), Australian footballer
 Oliver Jones (The Bold and the Beautiful), a character on soap opera The Bold and the Beautiful
 Ollie Jones (cyclist) (born 1996), New Zealand racing cyclist
 Ollie Jones (songwriter) (1923–1990), American singer and songwriter
 Skream (Oliver Jones, born 1986), dubstep producer from Croydon, UK